The Wrong Man is a 1917 American silent Western film, featuring Harry Carey. Like many American films of the time, The Wrong Man was subject to cuts by city and state film censorship boards. The Chicago Board of Censors cut six holdup scenes from the film.

Cast
 Harry Carey
 Francelia Billington
 Vester Pegg
 William Steele credited as William Gettinger
 Hoot Gibson
 Helen Gibson
 George Berrell

See also
 Harry Carey filmography
 Hoot Gibson filmography

References

External links
 

1917 films
1917 short films
1917 Western (genre) films
American silent short films
American black-and-white films
Censored films
Films directed by Fred Kelsey
Silent American Western (genre) films
1910s American films
1910s English-language films